Antonis Volanis (also known as Antoine Volanis) is a Greek industrial designer, born in Thessaloniki in 1948. He has mainly worked in France (since 1968), where he cooperated with Peugeot, Matra (he is the designer of the Bagheera, Rancho and Murena), Renault (designer of the Espace), Aérospatiale, Tefal, Donnay (sports goods) and many others. He was also instrumental in the design development of the revolutionary LOOK KG196, a French  carbon monocoque racing bicycle, on which his trademark decal appears. He established Design Volanis S.A. in Paris which has also cooperated with a number of other European carmakers and industrial corporations.

References 
L.S. Skartsis and G.A. Avramidis, "Made in Greece", Typorama, Patras, Greece (2003).
Car Styling Magazine, "Design Volanis - Design That Anticipate Consumer Demands", Vol. 113 (July 1996).

1948 births
Living people
Greek automobile designers
Engineers from Thessaloniki